A Sip of Love (Turkish: Bir Yudum Sevgi)  is a 1984 Turkish drama film, co-written, co-produced and directed by Atıf Yılmaz, featuring Kadir İnanır and Hale Soygazi as an unhappily married couple, who are divided when he loses his job and she is forced to find factory work. The film screened in competition at the 21st Antalya Golden Orange Film Festival, where it won Golden Oranges for Best Film, Best Director, Best Actress, Best Supporting Actress and Best Music, and the 4th International Istanbul Film Festival, where it won Best Turkish Film.

Plot
Aygül and Cemal live a joyless life, stuck in an unhappy marriage with four children.  After Cemal loses his job and Aygül is forced to go and work in a factory to support the family, she moves away taking their children with her and he tries to win them back.

Cast
Kadir İnanır (Cemal)
Hale Soygazi (Aygül) 
Macit Koper (Cuma) 
Meral Çetinkaya (Nezaket)

Awards
The film won 5 awards at the 21st Antalya Golden Orange Film Festival: Best Film, Best Director (for Atıf Yılmaz), Best Actress (for Hale Soygazi), Best Supporting Actor (for Macit Koper) and Best Music (for Yalçın Tura). It also won the Best Turkish Film award at the İstanbul Film Festival.

References

External links

1984 drama films
Films set in Turkey
Films shot in Turkey
Golden Orange Award for Best Film winners
Turkish drama films
1980s Turkish-language films
1984 films